The Morals of Marcus is a 1935 British comedy film directed by Miles Mander and starring Lupe Vélez, Ian Hunter and Adrianne Allen. The screenplay concerns an archaeologist who finds a woman hiding in his luggage who has escaped from a harem and they eventually fall in love and marry. The Morals of Marcus was previously filmed twice as silents in 1915 with Marie Doro and in 1921 with May McAvoy.

Production
It was based on the novel The Morals of Marcus Ordeyne by William John Locke and was filmed at Twickenham Studios. It was part of the producer Julius Hagen's ambitious programme of film production at Twickenham. Hagen brought in Vélez, a leading Mexican actress, to give the film greater international appeal.

Main cast
 Ian Hunter as Sir Marcus Ordeyne
 Lupe Vélez as Carlotta
 Adrianne Allen as Judith
 Noel Madison as Tony Pasquale
 J.H. Roberts as Butler
 Frank Atkinson as Ship Steward

References

Bibliography
 Richards, Jeffrey (ed.) The Unknown 1930s: An Alternative History of the British Cinema, 1929-1939. I.B. Tauris, 1998.

1935 films
1935 comedy films
Films directed by Miles Mander
British comedy films
Films shot at Twickenham Film Studios
Films based on British novels
Films set in London
Films set in Syria
British black-and-white films
Sound film remakes of silent films
British remakes of American films
1930s English-language films
1930s British films